Musa ibn Ka'b al-Tamimi was an 8th-century Arab commander during the Abbasid Revolution and then provincial governor for the Abbasid Caliphate.

Biography
Musa first appears as one of the "twelve naqibs" who prepared the Abbasid Revolution in Khurasan, and served as a commander when the revolt broke out, fighting in the Battle of the Zab. In the retinue of Abdallah ibn Ali he ended up in Syria. Abdallah placed him as governor for the Jazira, where fought against pro-Umayyad rebels under Abu al-Ward.

Caliph al-Saffah then appointed him as his sahib al-shurta, before sending him to Sind to overthrow the local governor, Mansur ibn Jumhur, who had seized the province during the turmoils of the previous years. Defeated in battle, Mansur fled to the desert, where he died, and Musa succeeded him as governor. Musa remained in Sind until the death of al-Saffah in 754, whereupon he left Sind under his son Unayna as deputy and returned to Iraq, resuming his position as sahib al-shurta. In 758 the new caliph, al-Mansur, appointed him as governor of Egypt, but his tenure there was brief, as he died within the same year (758/9). His son Unayna rebelled in Sind and was killed by local Yamanis.

References

Sources 
 
 

Date of birth unknown
759 deaths
8th-century Abbasid governors of Egypt
Generals of the Abbasid Caliphate
Abbasid governors of Egypt
Abbasid governors of Sind
People of the Abbasid Revolution
8th-century Arabs
Banu Tamim